The Siding Spring Survey (SSS) was a near-Earth object search program that used the 0.5-metre Uppsala Southern Schmidt Telescope at Siding Spring Observatory, New South Wales, Australia. It was the southern hemisphere counterpart of the Catalina Sky Survey (CSS) located in the Santa Catalina Mountains on Mount Bigelow, near Tucson, Arizona, USA.  The survey was the only professional search for dangerous asteroids being made in the Southern Hemisphere.

SSS was jointly operated by the University of Arizona and the Australian National University, with funding from NASA.

Images of 30 seconds' exposure time were collected using a 4×4K charge-coupled device at intervals and then compared with software.

The survey ended in July 2013 after funding was discontinued.

Discoveries

Since 2004 the survey has discovered 400 potentially hazardous objects with a diameter greater than 100 m.
In early January 2013, Robert H. McNaught discovered a new comet named C/2013 A1 using data collected while searching for asteroids.

List of discovered minor planets

See also 
 
List of near-Earth object observation projects

References

External links 
 Siding Spring Survey

2004 establishments in Australia
2013 disestablishments in Australia
Astronomical surveys
Asteroid surveys

Siding Spring Observatory
University of Arizona